Golden Warrior may refer to:

 Golden Warrior Monument, a monument in Almaty, Kazakhstan 
 Golden Man, a skeleton discovered in the Issyk kurgan in Kazakhstan
 VFA-87, a United States Navy fighter squadron nicknamed the "Golden Warriors"
 Gohan, a Dragon Ball character aliased the "Golden Warrior"
 The Golden Warrior: The Life and Legend of Lawrence of Arabia, a 1990 book by Lawrence James

 Gold Warriors: America's Secret Recovery of Yamashita's Gold, a 2003 book by Sterling  and Peggy Seagrave

See also
 Golden Warrior Gold Lightan, a 1981 anime series
 Golden Axe Warrior, a 1991 video game
 The Golden Cane Warrior, a 2014 film
 Golden State Warriors, a basketball team